Overhoff is a surname. Notable people with the surname include:

Kurt Overhoff (1902–1986), Austrian conductor and composer
Marijke Overhoff (born 1980), Dutch woman cricketer
Sybille Edith Overhoff (born 1926), British expert on Etruscology

See also 
Overhoff Technology, is a subsidiary of US Nuclear Corp. based in Milford, Ohio